Karen is a 2021 American crime-thriller film written and directed by Coke Daniels, and starring Taryn Manning, Cory Hardrict, Jasmine Burke, Roger Dorman, Brandon Sklenar, and Gregory Alan Williams. The title of the film is a reference to the American "Karen" stereotype. The film was critically panned upon release.

Plot
Malik and Imani Jeffries, a young black couple, move into a new house in the fictional affluent suburban Atlanta community of Harvey Hill, named after Confederate general Daniel Harvey Hill. Harvey Hill Homeowners Association president Karen Drexler, their next-door neighbor, quickly introduces herself to Malik; she refuses to shake his hand, callously comments about not "having any cash" in her home, and installs a security camera directed towards their house. Although perplexed by Karen's behavior, the couple decides to ignore their concerns and focus on settling in.

Unbeknownst to both of them, the virulently racist Karen has Neo-Confederate memorabilia in her home and a reputation for abusing her power as president to target local black residents, often recruiting her equally racist brother, Atlanta Police Department patrolman Michael Wind, to assist her. She soon starts harassing and stalking the couple, trying to find something she can use to get them out of Harvey Hill. She discovers that Malik secretly smokes marijuana and catches her teenage son Kyle watching the couple have sex in front of an open window, but when she raises the issue at a meeting of the association's executive board, the other members, disturbed by her bigoted remarks about African Americans, decide against taking any action.

After learning that the couple is holding a housewarming party for their friends, Karen convinces Imani that she wants to make amends and is invited. At the party, she quickly offends everyone present, including the couple, by insinuating that black Americans are being too angry and that if they dislike the country, they should just return to Africa. The next day, Karen encounters three young black men, demanding that they identify themselves. They refuse, and she calls Mike, falsely accusing them of harassment. He arrests them, but they are quickly released after video footage of Karen's phone call, recorded by the trio, and their subsequent arrest, recorded by Imani on her cellphone, surfaces. The association then fires her as president after being sued by prominent civil rights lawyer Charles Wright, the father of one of the young men.

Growing more deranged and frustrated, Karen gets Mike to pull Malik over while driving home from work by revealing his past marijuana usage. Finding no marijuana in Malik's car, Mike plants a bag of the substance in the trunk, subsequently arresting him following a physical altercation. After his rookie partner, Officer Hill, accuses him of racism, Mike threatens to kill Hill if he ever double-crosses him again in the field, warning that a secret brotherhood within the police force shields him from any charges. Malik manages to post his own bail and arrives home the following morning. Karen then visits Imani, asking her and Malik to leave the neighborhood to avoid any more trouble, but Imani defiantly declines. The couple then hires Charles to represent them, who shows them a file suggesting that after a Black vigilante killed Karen's police officer husband Ken Drexler and two other officers a few years earlier, Karen became unhinged and was later dismissed from her job as an elementary school teacher for making racist remarks towards her students.

That night, Mike, alerted by Karen of recent events, arrives with a falsified search warrant and arrests Malik again for owning an unregistered handgun, and Imani tearfully calls Charles, who calls the precinct and discovers Malik was not formally booked. Meanwhile, Karen cuts the power to the couple's house and breaks in with a gun. While Imani defends herself with a sword, Karen shoots at her several times, prompting a neighbor to call the police. Mike immediately rushes to Imani's house, where the siblings threaten her at gunpoint before Karen shoots her in the shoulder, seemingly killing her. Hill rushes in, and a standoff ensues until Mike and Hill shoot each other at close range; Mike is killed while Hill is only slightly wounded. Karen prepares to finish him off, but a still-alive Imani grabs Mike's gun and kills her in self-defense.

Malik is released from custody, and he and Imani receive a full apology and compensation from the city for their ordeal. Imani, now pregnant, assumes Karen's position within the Homeowners Association and successfully renames the community to John Lewis.

Cast
 Taryn Manning as Karen Drexler (née Wind)
 Cory Hardrict as Malik Jeffries
 Jasmine Burke as Imani Jeffries
 Roger Dorman as Officer Mike Wind
 Brandon Sklenar as Officer Hill
 Gregory Alan Williams as Charles Wright
 Veronika Bozeman as Fatima
 Dawn Halfkenny as Chanel McFadden

Production

Principal photography began in Georgia in December 2020. Filming wrapped in February 2021.

Release
In August 2021, it was announced that Quiver Distribution acquired North American distribution rights to the film, which was released theatrically and on demand on September 3, 2021.

Reception

Critical response
The film received mostly negative reviews from critics.  Writing for RogerEbert.com, Nick Allen wrote that "The movie is clueless about to how be a thriller, in either a serious or tongue-in-cheek way...Even with the most basic forms of gratuitous schlock, Karen does not try."

Michael Nordine, in Variety, wrote that "Anyone subjected to this...will want to get out of the theater as quickly as possible. Writer-director Coke Daniels’ satirical thriller offers little in the way of incisive social commentary or thrills...Karen plays out instead as a parade of clichés that escalate in terms of intensity but not tension. Karen reveals herself as an irredeemable racist the moment we meet her, and so there’s never any depth to her character...Shaky production values – abrupt cuts, image quality that feels more made-for-TV than silver screen – don’t help, but the main culprit is Daniels’ painfully unsubtle script."

Richard Roeper commented in the Chicago Sun-Times that this "poorly executed tale of a hateful racist isn’t even worth watching as a curiosity. [It] contains no valuable insight or social commentary and simply plays like a Greatest Hits (or should we say Biggest F-Bombs) of horrific, racist, hateful behavior by the title character. This movie is so broad and so poorly executed it comes across as an extended SNL parody of a Jordan Peele film."

On TheWrap website, Elizabeth Weitzman observed that the film was a "genuine jaw-dropper on multiple levels, Coke Daniels’ Karen is a misbegotten thriller about a woman named Karen who actually is a Karen...Considering that there’s not a single twist or surprising moment, Karen fails as a thriller. Given that it delivers its messages – that Black lives matter, and that Karens and some cops are racist – with all the subtlety of a meme, it fails as a cultural critique."

Accolades

References

External links
 

2021 black comedy films
2021 crime thriller films
2020s English-language films
American crime thriller films
Films about racism in the United States
Films shot in Georgia (U.S. state)
2020s American films